Laiksaare is a village in Saarde Parish, Pärnu County in southwestern Estonia.

Notable people
 
 
Villem Orav (1883-1952), Estonian historian, teacher, and scholar of pedagogy

References

 

Villages in Pärnu County